Crazy Love is a South Korean television series starring Kim Jae-wook, Krystal Jung, and Ha Jun. It aired on KBS2 from March 7 to April 26, 2022, every Monday and Tuesday at 21:30 (KST). Initially, scheduled to be release as one of iQiYi's originals, the series was instead streamed on Disney+ in selected regions.

Synopsis
Crazy Love tells the love story of Noh Go-jin (Kim Jae-wook), the CEO of GOTOP which is the South Korea's top math institute, pretending to have amnesia after receiving death threats, and Lee Shin-ah (Krystal Jung), Go-jin's introvert and quiet secretary, who doesn't have much time left. Shin-ah later pretends to be the fiancé of Go-jin knowing he has amnesia.

Cast

Main
 Kim Jae-wook as Noh Go-jin
 Korea's best math instructor and CEO of GOTOP education.
 Krystal Jung as Lee Shin-ah
 Go-jin's secretary.
 Ha Jun as Oh Se-gi
 The handsome vice president of GOTOP education who is the only person who can comfort Go-jin.

Supporting

People related to GOTOP
 Kim Ki-nam as Gong Hee-cheol
 Baek Joo-hee as Chief Ma
 Lee Ji-min as Michelle Lee
 A unique English teacher who has been scouted by Noh Go-jin for a penalty.
 Lee Si-eon as Kang Min
 A former English teacher who was kicked out by Noh Go-jin.
 Jo In as Kim Hye-sun
 Noh Go-jin's former secretary and the current salesman of the study book.
 Moon Do-yoon as Lee So-ra 
 Noh Go-jin's former secretary who resigned after 3 months due to Gojinno's strict temperament beyond meticulousness.
 Lee Mi-young as a cleaning employee
 Lee Yoon-hee as a security guard
 Jung Sung-ho as Kim Cha-bae

People around  Lee Shin-ah
 Park Han-sol as Chu Ok-hee 
 Lee Shin-ah's close friend who lives with her. Ok-hee has a career as a stage actor. She is a true friend that Shin-ah can rely on. During the day, she works part-time as a secretary at a lawyer's office and goes to auditions all the time.
 Yoon San-ha as Lee Su-ho 
 Lee Shin-ah's brother
 Kim Hak-sun as Lee Yong-gu
 Lee Shin-ah's father

Others
 Im Won-hee as Park Tae-yang
 Mirae Edu's representative.
 Yoo In-young as Baek Soo-young
 Noh Go-jin's first love.
 Ko Kyu-pil as Joo Jun-pal 
A solver of the Heungshinso, who is called detective Zhull
 Lee Ha-jin
 Seo Ji-hoo as Baek Soo-young's loyal secretary

Special appearance 
 Tae In-ho as a reporter
 Yoon Sa-bong as Hong Yeo-sa
 Park Tae-yang's wife
 Jung Shin-hye as Oh Se-hee, Oh Se-gi sister

Original soundtrack

Part 1

Part 2

Part 3

Part 4

Part 5

Part 6

Viewership

References

External links
  
 
 
 

Korean Broadcasting System television dramas
Korean-language television shows
2022 South Korean television series debuts
2022 South Korean television series endings
IQIYI original programming
South Korean romantic comedy television series